Belli dentro (Beautiful Inside) is an Italian comedy television series, notable for its setting in a prison.

See also
List of Italian television series

External links
 

Italian television series
Canale 5 original programming
Italia 1 original programming